The Cook Rutledge House is a historic Italianate-style house located in Chippewa Falls, Wisconsin. It was added to the National Register of Historic Places in 1974.

History
The house was built around 1873 by lawyer and future Lieutenant Governor of Wisconsin James M. Bingham and his wife, Justine. After James's death, Justine sold the house in 1887 to Irish immigrant Edward Rutledge, vice-president of the Chippewa Lumber and Boom Company and an assistant to Frederick Weyerhaeuser. In 1888 Rutledge altered the mansion to its present appearance. In 1915 the house was sold to Dayton E. Cook, a prominent lawyer and county judge. His family lived there for many years, finally selling the house to the Chippewa County Historical Society in 1973. The house serves as a museum. The site is also available to rent for special occasions.

References

External links
 Cook-Rutledge Mansion - official site

Houses on the National Register of Historic Places in Wisconsin
Historic house museums in Wisconsin
Houses in Chippewa County, Wisconsin
Italianate architecture in Wisconsin
Museums in Chippewa County, Wisconsin
National Register of Historic Places in Chippewa County, Wisconsin